The 1939 Cornell Big Red football team was an American football team that represented Cornell University as an independent during the 1939 college football season. In its fourth season under head coach Carl Snavely, Cornell compiled an 8–0 record and outscored opponents by a total of 197 to 52. After the season, Cornell declined a bid to the 1940 Rose Bowl so that the football players could catch up on their schoolwork. 

On December 1, Cornell was awarded the Lambert Trophy as the best Eastern college football team. In the final AP Poll released on December 12, Cornell was ranked No. 4 nationally, behind Texas A&M, Tennessee, and USC. In later retroactive rankings, Cornell was named national champion by Litkenhous and co-national champion in the Sagarin Ratings. 

Cornell tackle Nick Drahos was a consensus first-team selection on the 1939 All-America college football team. He was inducted in 1981 into the College Football Hall of Fame. Quarterback Walter Matuszczak was also selected as a first-team All-American by the New York Sun.

Schedule

References

Cornell
Cornell Big Red football seasons
College football national champions
Lambert-Meadowlands Trophy seasons
College football undefeated seasons
Cornell Big Red football